Virajini Lalithya de Silva, also known as Nirosha Virajini (Sinhala: නිරෝෂා විරාජිනී) is a Sri Lankan award-winning singer, musician and music director with a career spanning over 23 years.

Personal life 

Nirosha was born on 13 January 1973. She is a native of Kandy, Sri Lanka. She was married to Nalinda Sampath in 2000, but the couple got divorced in 2005. She married Yasantha Nimalatheja in 2009.

Career 

Nirosha has sung songs in Sinhalese, Tamil, Hindi, and Malayalam.

Awards and honors 
In 2000, 2002, and 2016, she was awarded as Best Female Vocalist at President's Award and Sarasaviya Awards for her contribution as a playback singer in the films "Rajya Sevaya Pinisai" and "Kinihiriya Mal" respectively.

References

1973 births
21st-century Sri Lankan women singers
Sinhalese singers
Living people